William Marsh may refer to:

 William Marsh (priest) (1775–1864), British priest and writer of theological publications
 William Marsh (fencer) (1877–1959), British fencer
 William Marsh (cricketer) (1917–1978), Welsh cricketer
 William Henry Marsh (1827–1906), British colonial administrator
 Billy Marsh (1917–1995), British theatrical agent
 Stan Marsh, misreferenced as "Billy" by his grandpa Marvin Marsh
 Willie Marsh, golfer, see Bing Crosby Handicap
 Bill Marsh (rugby league) (1929–2002), Australian rugby league footballer
 W. W. Marsh (William Wallace Marsh, 1835–1918), American inventor and businessman
 William F. Marsh, served in the California legislature
 William John Marsh (1880–1971), American musician
 William H. Marsh (diplomat), U.S. diplomat
 William Marsh (New Hampshire politician), state representative